Aşkale is a town and district of the Erzurum province of Turkey. The mayor is Enver Başaran (AKP). The population is 12,509 (as of 2010).

Kandilli Ski Resort, which hosts cross-country skiing and biathlon competitions at some international winter sports events, is situated in Aşkale.

Labour camps for non-Muslims 

In 1942, the Varlık Vergisi ("wealth tax" or "capital tax") was imposed on the minority non-Muslim citizens of Turkey (mainly Jews, Greeks, Armenians, and Levantines. Those unable to pay had to work off their debt in labor camps in Aşkale. Five thousand were sent to the Aşkale labor camp. The law was repealed on 15 March 1944, and minority citizens who were at the labour camps were sent back to their homes.

Neighbourhoods
 Abdalcık
 Akören
 Altıntaş
 Bağırsak
 Ballıtaş
 Bozburun
 Büyükgeçit
 Çatalbayır
 Çatören
 Çayköy
 Çiftlik
 Dağyurdu
 Dallı
 Demirkıran
 Dereköy
 Düzyurt
 Eyüpoğlu
 Gökçebük
 Gölören
 Güllüdere
 Gümüşseren
 Güneyçam
 Gürkaynak
 Hacıbekir
 Hacıhamza
 Hacımahmut
 Hatuncuk
 Haydarhacı
 Kapıkale
 Karahasan
 Karasu
 Kavurmaçukuru
 Koçbaba
 Koşapınar
 Kurtmahmut
 Küçükgeçit
 Küçükova
 Kükürtlü
 Merdivenköy
 Mezrea
 Musadanışman
 Ocaklı
 Ovacık
 Özler
 Pırnakapan
 Saptıran
 Sarıbaba
 Sazlı
 Taşağıl
 Taşlıçayır
 Tecer
 Tepsicik
 Tokça
 Topalçavuş
 Tosunlu
 Tozluca
 Turaç
 Yaylaköy
 Yaylayolu
 Yaylımlı
 Yumruveren

References

Populated places in Erzurum Province
Districts of Erzurum Province